Grey out or gray out may refer to:

 A greyout is a dimming of vision, sometimes referred to as a brownout.
 A grayed out appearance of a control in a software user interface, indicating that the command is currently unavailable.